Jed Holloway (born 2 November 1992) is an Australian professional rugby union footballer. He currently plays for NSW Country Eagles,  and the Wallabies (the Australian national team). His usual playing positions are number 8, flanker or lock.

Early life
Holloway was born in Wollongong, where he first played junior rugby with the Woonona Shamrocks club. His family moved to Yamba in northern New South Wales when he was nine years of age. He attended McAuley Catholic College and he joined the Yamba Buccaneers junior rugby club. Holloway later attended Waverley College in Sydney and was selected for the Australian Schoolboys side in 2010.

Rugby career
Holloway joined the Southern Districts club where he played his senior club rugby in the Shute Shield competition. He represented Australia U20 in South Africa at the 2012 IRB Junior World Championship.

He was contracted to the Waratahs extended playing squad for the 2013 season, and made his Super Rugby debut against the Western Force in March of that year. At the age of 21, Holloway was named captain of the Greater Sydney Rams team for the inaugural season of Australia's National Rugby Championship in 2014. 

Holloway joined Irish Pro14 and Champions Cup side Munster on a two-month contract at the end of September 2019 to provide World Cup cover for the province. He made his debut for the province in their 2019–20 Pro14 round 2 fixture against South African side Southern Kings on 5 October 2019, which Munster won 31–20. His fourth and final appearance for Munster came in their 18–16 defeat against Scottish side Edinburgh on 29 November 2019.

International rugby career
Holloway had been tipped to be selected for the Wallabies in the three-test series against England in July 2022 but he was injured in training. After recovering, he finally made his debut for Australia against Argentina on 6th August 2022. He played both tests of the 2022 Bledisloe cup series against New Zealand, impressing with his tackling and ball carrying. In the majority of his matches for the Wallabies, he has started at blind-side flanker but he has also occasionally started at lock. 

In January 2023, Holloway was named in the 44-man Wallabies training squad for the 2023 Rugby World Cup.

Super Rugby statistics

References

External links

Waratahs profile
Munster profile

1992 births
Living people
Australian rugby union players
Greater Sydney Rams players
Munster Rugby players
New South Wales Country Eagles players
New South Wales Waratahs players
Rugby union flankers
Rugby union locks
Rugby union number eights
Rugby union players from Wollongong
Toyota Verblitz players
Australia international rugby union players